{{Infobox television
| image        = Say Yes to the Dress Atlanta.jpg
| genre        = Reality
| country      = United States
| language     = English
| num_seasons  = 10
| starring     = 
| num_episodes = 156
| runtime      = 20 to 22 minutes
| company      = North South Productions
| channel      = TLC
| first_aired  = 
| last_aired   = 
| related      = {{Plainlist|
 Say Yes to the Dress
 Say Yes to the Dress: Bridesmaids
}}
}}Say Yes to the Dress: Atlanta is an American reality television series on TLC which follows events at Bridals by Lori in the Atlanta suburb of Sandy Springs. The series shows the progress of individual sales associates, managers, and fitters at the store, along with profiling brides as they search for the perfect wedding dress. It is a spin-off of Say Yes to the Dress.

BackgroundSay Yes to the Dress: Atlanta was first announced in July 2010. The show features Lori Allen, who has been the owner of Bridals by Lori in Atlanta since 1980. The shop was celebrating its 30th anniversary the year it was chosen as the setting of the show. The show also features image consultant Monte Durham. Other people featured on the show are Bridals by Lori manager Robin Gibbs and assistant manager Flo Waters. Durham and Allen were friends from working together previously, including on the television show Platinum Weddings, which led to Durham becoming the fashion director for the show.

In order to appear on the show, brides apply online and then go through a casting process. The brides and the families receive no compensation for appearing on the show, and are not obligated to purchase a dress from the store. Out of the 21 dressing rooms in the store, number a10 is used for the show. In 2012 the show also provided an opportunity for brides who were also breast cancer survivors to have the story of their weddings shown in special episodes of the series.

Spin-offs
The Atlanta series itself generated two spin-offs:
 Say Yes to the Dress: Bridesmaids (July 2011-) is a spinoff focused on bridesmaid dresses and the bridesmaid showroom at Bridals by Lori.
 Say Yes to the Dress: Monte's Take'' (2011–12) is a podcast hosted by Monte Durham, the bridal image consultant at Bridals by Lori and TLC Interactive Producer Candace Keener. The weekly podcast provides listeners wedding tips and tricks.

Episodes

Season 1 (2010)

Season 2 (2011)

Season 3 (2012)

Season 4 (2012)

Season 5 (2013)

Season 6 (2013–14)

Season 7 (2014)

Season 8 (2015)

Season 9 (2016)

Season 10 (2018)

Season 11 (2020)

References

External links

Bridals by Lori Say Yes to the Dress Site

2010s American reality television series
2010 American television series debuts
TLC (TV network) original programming
Wedding television shows
Television shows set in Atlanta
American television spin-offs
Reality television spin-offs
English-language television shows
Wedding dresses